Günther Huber (born 28 October 1965) is an Italian bobsledder who competed in the 1990s. Before taking up bobsledding, he had originally started his sporting career in luge, with his most notable result being a third place in doubles in the 1982 World Junior Luge Championships: he switched to bobsleigh in 1988.

Biography
Huber was a member of Centro Sportivo Carabinieri.  He competed in four Winter Olympics and won two medals in the two-man event with one gold (with Antonio Tartaglia in 1998, shared with Canada's Pierre Lueders and David MacEachern) and one bronze (with Stefano Ticci in 1994).

Huber also won two medals in the two-man event at the FIBT World Championships with a gold in 1999 and a silver in 1997. His World Championship title came at the end of a troubled four-month period during which his bobsleigh was stolen, and then first Tartaglia and his replacements Massimiliano Rota and Enrico Costa were injured, with the later finally being replaced by Ubaldo Ranzi.

Huber took his first World Cup podium during the 1991-92 season with a third in the two-man event at St. Moritz, and scored his first World Cup race win in another two-man race at Lillehammer the following season. He won the Bobsleigh World Cup championship three times (Two-man: 1991-2, 1992-3; Combined men's: 1996-7).

He also took six medals at the European Championships, including two golds, one each in two-man and four-man competition. In addition he won eight Italian national titles, seven in two-man and one in four-man.

Huber is a bobsleigh coach for the Italian national team as of 2008. He is the brother of lugers Arnold Huber, Norbert Huber and Wilfried Huber.

References
 Bobsleigh two-man Olympic medalists 1932-56 and since 1964
 Bobsleigh two-man world championship medalists since 1931
 DatabaseOlympics.com profile
  List of combined men's bobsleigh World Cup champions: 1985-2007
 List of four-man bobsleigh World Cup champions since 1985
 List of two-man bobsleigh World Cup champions since 1985

1965 births
Living people
Italian male bobsledders
Bobsledders at the 1992 Winter Olympics
Bobsledders at the 1994 Winter Olympics
Bobsledders at the 1998 Winter Olympics
Bobsledders at the 2002 Winter Olympics
Olympic bobsledders of Italy
Olympic gold medalists for Italy
Olympic bronze medalists for Italy
Olympic medalists in bobsleigh
Medalists at the 1998 Winter Olympics
Medalists at the 1994 Winter Olympics
Italian sports coaches
Bobsledders of Centro Sportivo Carabinieri
Italian male lugers
Lugers of Centro Sportivo Carabinieri
Sportspeople from Bruneck